The English general election, which began in November 1701, produced substantial gains for the Whigs, who enthusiastically supported the war with France. The Tories had been criticised in the press for their ambivalence towards the war, and public opinion had turned against them; they consequently lost ground as a result of the election. Ninety-one constituencies, 34% of the total in England and Wales, were contested.

Summary of the constituencies
See 1796 British general election for details. The constituencies used in England and Wales were the same throughout the period. In 1707 alone the 45 Scottish members were not elected from the constituencies, but were returned by co-option of a part of the membership of the last Parliament of Scotland elected before the Union.

Party strengths are an approximation, with many MPs' allegiances being unknown.

See also 
 6th Parliament of King William III
 List of parliaments of England

References

External links
 History of Parliament: Members 1690–1715
 History of Parliament: Constituencies 1690–1715

1701 in politics
Elections to the Parliament of England
General election
18th-century elections in Europe